The Dawson Creek Daily News is a daily newspaper serving Dawson Creek and the South Peace River region of northeastern British Columbia, Canada. The paper was founded in 1930 as the Peace River Block News and has been owned since 2006 by Glacier Media.

History
Charles S. Kitchen, James E. "Cap" Lean and Bill Carruthers produced the first edition of the weekly Peace River Block News in 1930 in Rolla, British Columbia. Half a year later, Dawson Creek became a rail hub and the newspaper relocated there. The Kitchen family continued to run and grow the paper; by 1970 it was printing 5,300 copies per week and employed a staff of 22.

In 1972, Norm Kitchen sold the Peace River Block News to Del Folk and Don Marshall, who increased its frequency to twice per week, Wednesdays and Fridays. Marshall later became the full owner, and remained publisher for a few years after 1976 when he sold the paper to Sterling Newspapers Ltd., a subsidiary of Hollinger Inc., the newspaper conglomerate controlled by Conrad Black.

Sterling converted the paper to full daily publication and upgraded its presses in 1987.

Along with several other small British Columbia dailies, the Peace River Block News was one of the last Hollinger properties to be sold, to Vancouver-based Glacier Ventures International, later called Glacier Media, in 2006. The next year, Glacier changed the paper's name to Dawson Creek Daily News.

See also
List of newspapers in Canada

References

External links
Dawson Creek Daily News

Dawson Creek
Newspapers established in 1930
Daily newspapers published in British Columbia
1930 establishments in British Columbia